(Mr.) Beverly Lacy Hodghead (21 March 1865 – 16 October 1928) was the first mayor of the City of Berkeley, California, United States, serving from 1909 to 1911.  Although Berkeley had been incorporated since 1878 as a Town, the office of mayor did not exist until the adoption of a new charter which transformed Berkeley into a City.

Mr. Hodghead was born on March 21, 1865, in Rockbridge County, Virginia near the town of Lexington and moved to California as a child.  He was an attorney, an active Presbyterian throughout his life and very active in public service. He was president of the Astronomical Society of the Pacific in 1919–1920.

He married Nelle Eckles.  They had two children.

He died in Berkeley on October 16, 1928.  His wife died December 26, 1945.

References
 The Political Graveyard
 Register of the Hodghead (Beverly L.) Speeches & Other Papers, 1894-1910
 US Census, California, Alameda County (1910, 1920)

Mayors of Berkeley, California
1865 births
1928 deaths
Lawyers from Berkeley, California
19th-century American lawyers